Erna Witoelar ( Walinono; born 6 February 1947) is an Indonesian politician who was Minister of Human Settlements and Regional Development from 1996 to 2001.

Life
Andi Erna Anastasjia Walinono was born in near Lake Tempe in 1947.

She has been a UN Special Ambassador for the Millennium Development Goals and she sits on the board of various international and Indonesian committees and the International Institute for Sustainable Development. She is married to Rachmat Witoelar and they have three sons.

Witoelar is the former co-chair of Earth Charter International Council.

References

1947 births
Living people
Indonesian politicians
Politicians from South Sulawesi